Odvážná slečna is a 1969 Czechoslovak film. The film starred Josef Kemr.

References

External links
 

1969 films
Czechoslovak comedy films
1960s Czech-language films
Czech comedy films
1960s Czech films